The Peshawar Zalmi is a franchise cricket team that represents Peshawar in the Pakistan Super League. They are one of the five original teams. After the Multan Sultans joined the league, the league was expanded to six teams that took part in the 2018 Pakistan Super League. They defeated Quetta Gladiators in the final to win their maiden PSL title and making them defending champion in 2018.

Hasan Ali did not play the first for games but joined in the fifth to take 3 wickets. Darren Sammy was injured against Quetta Gladiators, but soon returned. They finished as Runners-up in the competition after defending the title against Islamabad United in the Final.

Squad
Shahid Afridi was traded to the Karachi Kings during off season, in return for one Gold and two Silver picks during the draft. This has been named as the biggest trade of the season. Iftikhar Ahmed was traded to the Islamabad United in exchange for supplementary pick in second round of draft.

References

2018 in Khyber Pakhtunkhwa
2018 Pakistan Super League
Zalmi in 2018
2018